The 604th Red Banner Special Purpose Centre "Vityaz" is a special forces unit of the National Guard of Russia.

History 

The history of the 604th Red Banner Special Purpose Centre "Vityaz" tracks back to the 1970s when, in preparation for the 1980 Moscow Olympics, an elite unit was formed. The personnel was drawn from the Separate Operational Purpose Division troops, and was trained with special forces tactics. The core of this group later became the "Vityaz" unit.

During the 1989 crisis in Nagorno-Karabakh, the unit was expanded: from the special-purpose training Company it was upgraded into a Battalion, and later the special purpose unit Vityaz was established.

The special forces unit "Rus'" was created on 1 August 1994; it may track its roots from the 4th Battalion of the Soviet OMSBON, the Independent Motorized Infantry Battalion of Special Purpose, later renamed ODON. The dedicated role of the Rus' unit was counter-terrorism and direct action in times of crisis, but actively participated in military and paramilitary operations in Chechnya and the broader North Caucasus region along with other MVD units, such as Vityaz.

After the collapse of the USSR, the North Caucasus became the main point of missions for MVD special forces units.

The 604th Special Purpose Centre was established on 1 September 2008, by merging OMSN "Vityaz" and OMSN "''Rus'''" spetsnaz units of the Internal Troops of the Ministry of Internal Affairs. With the establishment of the 604th Special Purpose Centre, subunits for specialised tasks as mine-warfare, parachuting, climbing and diving training were established. The Center itself is the recipient of the Order of Kutuzov.

On 5 April, 2016, the National Guard of Russia was established, resulting in the dissolution of the Interior Troops of Russia and the transfer of command of most armed forces under the MVD to the National Guard.

Reportedly, members of the unit have been killed in Ukraine during the 2022 Russian invasion of Ukraine.

Mission 
Forces of the 604th Special Purpose Centre are focused on rural actions and operations, such as liquidation of terrorist cells and heavy raids. However, large scale counterterrorism operations usually involve SOBR, spetsnaz, OMON and FSB units due to the large personnel demands.

See also 
 Spetsnaz
 Separate Operational Purpose Division
 SOBR
 National Guard Forces Command

References 

Special forces of Russia
National Guard of Russia
Military units and formations established in 2008
Units and formations of the National Guard of Russia